Murlidhar Ramachandra Acharekar (1907–1979) was an Indian artist and film art director in Hindi cinema who won the Filmfare Best Art Direction Award three times: for Pardesi (1958), for Kaagaz Ke Phool (1960), and for Jis Desh Men Ganga Behti Hai (1962).

Early life
Ramachandra Acharekar was born in Bombay.

Career
1923–28 M.R Acharekar Explored new areas of expression like photography and lithography. Started a lithopress, Bombay. Noted for his brilliant career with an early success at various exhibitions at home and abroad. Established himself easily as one of the most promising painters of his time. Executed important commissions like painting the historical event of the inauguration of the Round Table Conference by his late Majesty King George V of the United Kingdom, in 1932,the Silver Jubilee Celebrations of King George V in 1935, in London where he was sent with special credentials by the then Viceroy of India, Lord Willingdon.

He executed portraits of dignitaries and eminent men and women in India. His book, Rupadarsini, An Indian Approach to Human Form addressed the controversial issue of figure drawing. 

Acharekar remained in the forefront of portrait paintings, especially of the commemorative genre, for more than forty years. He was also an educationist and a successful art director who raised art direction to a new height in the field of cinema. His interest and superb ability in live portraiture is apparent in the ease and rapidity of his renditions of human figures, retaining their character and likeness. It was the perfect academic discipline gained in his early life, the sheet anchor of his artistic credo, which facilitated these easy renderings. He remained alive to change and rejuvenate, evolving gradually without sudden revolutionary mutations. He remained very much his own master with no direct and obvious influences of any "isms".

Career Highlights

Education
 1917–23 Studied at Ketkar Institute of Art, Bombay.
 1928 Diploma in Painting, Govt. of Maharashtra, Bombay.
 1932–34 Studied at Royal College of Art, London.

Exhibitions

Awards

Teaching experience
 1923 Appointed as Junior Teacher, Ketkar Institute of Art, Bombay.
 1937–39 Deputy Director, Sir J. J. School of Art, Bombay.
 1948–56 Principal, Academy of Art, Bombay.

Art Direction/Production Design

References

External links
 

1907 births
1979 deaths
Indian art directors
Recipients of the Padma Shri in arts
Indian portrait painters
People from Sindhudurg district
20th-century Indian painters
Painters from Maharashtra